Sleep Tight is a 2011 Spanish psychological thriller film directed by Jaume Balagueró from a screenplay by Alberto Marini. The film was developed under the title Flatmate and stars Luis Tosar alongside Marta Etura. In the film, César, a concierge of an apartment building, is unable to reach happiness no matter what happens to him, and he has a goal to make the tenants upset. Clara proves to César that making her upset is harder than he expected and things turn to a twisted event when her boyfriend Marcos visits her. Sleep Tight was considered one of the most anticipated films to be premiered at the 44th Sitges Film Festival.

Plot
A concierge of an apartment in Barcelona named Cesar is on the roof of a building explaining his nature of not being able to find any happiness no matter what he does or what good things happen to him. As he wakes up in Clara's apartment and begins his routine working in the main lobby, He gives hush money to Ursula, the daughter of another tenant. Cesar visits his sick mother in the hospital, who is practically unable to speak to her son but listens to him talk about Clara. Veronica, another tenant, asks Cesar to take care of her dogs giving detailed directions on how to feed them. Cesar ignores her instructions and feeds her dog Rocio a slice of pie. Clara, entering her apartment, opens up letters she has received then tears them up and throws them away all. While this is happening, Cesar hides under her bed waiting for her to fall asleep in order to use chloroform to keep her asleep so he can maliciously mess with her care product. The morning after, he sneaks out of Clara's apartment with Ursula waiting outside. She demands that Cesar provide her with an adult movie if he wants her to keep her mouth shut. Cesar, working in the lobby, finds Veronica heading out of the apartment. He questions Veronica where Rocio is and she explains that Rocio has horrible diarrhea from something he may have eaten.

Ursula, sneaking out of school, goes to Cesar's apartment and asks for the videotape and tells him that she and Clara talked about Cesar and the price for her keeping her mouth shut will be 100 euros. Cesar has also angered another of the tenants by not taking care of the plants, killing them. Visiting his mother at the hospital again, Cesar says that he is close to wiping Clara's smile off her face as his goal is to make his tenants miserable. The apartment cleaners are informed by Cesar that the office was not cleaned properly which leads to the cleaner's son being in trouble.

Cesar, once again hiding under Clara's bed, uses chloroform on her to keep her in a deep sleep and begins messing with more of Clara's items and plants bug eggs in her apartment. A couple of days pass and Clara's rashes which she was developing due to Cesar messing with her care products have slightly gone away, relieved for a second she finds many cockroaches in her apartment and decides to stay with her mother until Cesar fumigates her apartment. The police get involved to figure out who is harassing Clara and Cesar frames the cleaner's son which leads to his arrest.

Cesar returns to Clara's apartment and while hiding under her bed he finds that she brought her boyfriend Marcos as well. Having accidentally dropped some chloroform on his face, Cesar makes a desperate attempt to leave the apartment quietly but realizes he has the wrong keys to the apartment, leaving him locked inside. Cesar wakes up in Clara's shower and begins to worry as Marcos had found Cesar's sports bag with many suspicious items. Marcos catches Cesar trying to sneak out of the apartment. He explains his reason for being there. Deceiving them, he leaves the apartment and heads downstairs only to find out he is going to be vacated. Clara and Marcos are about to go on a trip and have to return as Clara turns out to be four weeks pregnant. Marcos is surprised as he always used a condom when they had sex.

Marcos knocks at Cesar's place and asks him to check out Clara's apartment, stating there is a bug problem again. Cesar goes to check the apartment but realizes that Marcos has caught onto him sneaking into her place and has found what Cesar has been drugging her with. Cesar and Marco begin to fight and Cesar grabs a piece of glass and stabs Marcos's neck, killing him. Knowing that Ursula knows Cesar was involved in Marcos's death, Cesar sneaks into her apartment and threatens Ursula to never rat him out to guarantee that Cesar does not go to jail. Clara has moved out of the apartment and had her baby, Cesar mails her a letter hoping that any time she looks at their child she will think of him, and he thanks her for helping him finally be happy.

Cast

 Luis Tosar as César
 Marta Etura as Clara
 Alberto San Juan as Marcos
 Pep Tosar as Úrsula's father 
 Petra Martínez as Verónica
 Amparo Fernández as The cleaning lady
 Iris Almeida as Úrsula
 Roger Morilla as The cleaning boy
 Margarita Roset as César's mother
 Manel Dueso as The commissioner

Production
Filmax narrated the film on the 2010 Cannes Film Festival and named Jaume Balagueró as director. Alberto Marini wrote the script of the film. Having success with the Rec film series, Balagueró felt it was important to start on something new and went on to direct Sleep Tight. The film was Balaguerós first film in which he directed but had not participated in the writing in the film but the elements of the story is what intrigued him. Balagueró stated that it was a challenge to have story in point of view of the villain and not the victim, hoping to establish a morality play that would make the audience a necessary participant. Balagueró cast in early May 2010 Luis Tosar and Marta Etura for the leads. Filmax and Balagueró filmed the project in Barcelona, Catalonia. It is Balagueró's first film since Fragile alone on the directing chair. The film had a budget of 5,000,000 Euros

Music 
Lucas Vidal is the composer of the film and the score is primarily on a principal Leitmotif which are melodic or dramatic passages to correspond to the plot of the film. Vidals score was nominated to the Jerry Goldsmith Awards of 2011, in the VII International Film Music Festival. The film also features many songs such as Next 2 You by Buckcherry, Keep Me In Mind by Patti Page, I Got To Have Your Love by The Fantastic Four (band), I Got to Have Your Smile by The Fantastic Four.

Release

Theatrical 
Sleep Tight had its world premier at Austin, Texas at the Fantastic Fest in September 2011 before being officially released in Spain on October 14, 2011 and reaching the United States theater's in 2012.

Home Media 
Sleep Tight was made available on Video on demand in October 2012 but officially released on DVD and Blu-ray on January 8, 2013.

Reception

Box Office 
Sleep Tight opened across 285 cinemas being in release for 80 days weeks and on opening weekend it earned $1,090,093. In Spain the film grossed $4,658,981 domestically and worldwide it grossed $8,791,590.

Critical response 
The review-aggregation website Rotten Tomatoes gives the film a 94% approval rating based on 31 published reviews—a weighted average of 7.3 out of 10. It has a score of 70 out of 100 on Metacritic based on 11 critics, indicating "generally favorable reviews."

Jonathan Holland of Variety had positive comments about the film stating that Sleep Tight "designed to give audience sleepless nights, and mostly succeeds". Simon Crook of Empire had similar comments to make stating that the film is "old-school, simmering with Hitchcockian suspense, but even the most hardened horror-heads will find its after-effects hard to brush off." Film Comment'''s Sophie Blum rated the film as a "five-star creepy stalker movie" and praises Tosar and Balugueró for having concocted a Sweeney Todd or [insert your favorite psychopath here] for the 21st century."

Manohla Dargis of The New York Times had mixed reviews claiming the chilly film works at first but that Balagueró "is so overtaken by his villain that he becomes like César, displaying an eagerness to play the role of tormentor, which kills both the movie’s pleasure and its flickering political subtext."

AccoladesSleep Tight won six awards at the 4th Catalan cinema Gaudí Awards: Gaudí award for Best Non-Catalan Language Film, Best Director, Best Original Screenplay, Best Film Editing, Best Sound, Best Leading Actor.

 Remake 
In 2018, a South Korean remake of the film titled Door Lock'' was released. The Korean movie tells the same story from the point of view of the victim rather than the perpetrator.

See also
 List of Spanish films of 2011
 List of films featuring home invasions

References

External links
 

2011 films
2011 psychological thriller films
Films set in apartment buildings
Films shot in Spain
Spanish thriller films
2010s Spanish-language films
Films directed by Jaume Balagueró
Films set in Barcelona
Films scored by Lucas Vidal
Filmax films
Castelao Producciones films
Films about rape
Home invasions in film
2010s Spanish films
Spanish psychological thriller films